5-Nitroimidazole is an organic compound with the formula O2NC3H2N2H.  The nitro group at position 5 on the imidazole ring is the most common positional isomer.  The term nitroimidazole also refers to a class of antibiotics that share similar chemical structures.

Synthesis
Imidazole undergoes a nitration reaction with a mixture of nitric acid and sulfuric acid to give 5-nitroimidazole:
C3H3N2H +  HNO3 + H2SO4 → O2NC3H2N2H + H2O

Nitroimidazole antibiotics

From the chemistry perspective, nitroimidazole antibiotics can be classified according to the location of the nitro functional group. Structures with names 4- and 5-nitroimidazole are equivalent from the perspective of drugs since these tautomers readily interconvert.  Drugs of the 5-nitro variety include metronidazole, tinidazole, nimorazole, dimetridazole, pretomanid, ornidazole, megazol, and azanidazole. Drugs based on  2-nitromidazoles include benznidazole.
 
Nitroimidazole antibiotics have been used to combat anaerobic bacterial and parasitic infections. Perhaps the most common example is metronidazole. Other heterocycles such as nitrothiazoles (thiazole) are also used for this purpose.  Nitroheterocycles may be reductively activated in hypoxic cells, and then undergo redox recycling or decompose to toxic products.

References 

Disulfiram-like drugs